The People's Salvation Cathedral, also known as the National Cathedral, is an Eastern Orthodox cathedral under construction in Bucharest to serve as the patriarchal cathedral of the Romanian Orthodox Church. It is located in central Bucharest on Spirea's Hill (Arsenal Square), facing the same courtyard as the Palace of Parliament which is the heaviest building in the world, the cathedral having a tenth of its weight and about 24% of its volume. Situated behind the Palace of Parliament, this will make it 50 metres taller than the Palace, and will help to make the cathedral an iconic landmark in the city.

It is the tallest and largest Eastern Orthodox church building by volume, and area, in the world. The People's Salvation Cathedral will have the largest collection of church mosaics in the world (interior decoration) when it is completed, having about 18,000 square meters, including the mosaic of the altar is about 3,000 square meters. The mosaic of the National Cathedral contains glass made in Venice and Florence, as well as Carrara stone. Also the People's Salvation Cathedral has the world's largest Orthodox iconostasis (23.8 meters length and 17.1 meters height) and the world's largest free-swinging church bell.

The cathedral is dedicated to the Ascension of Christ, which in Romania is celebrated as the Heroes' Day, and to Saint Andrew the Apostle, protector of Romania. The cathedral was consecrated on 25 November 2018 by the Ecumenical Patriarch of Constantinople Bartholomew I, Patriarch Daniel of Romania and Metropolitan Chrysostomos (gr) of Patras from the Greek Orthodox Church. On the same day as the consecration, the very first church service of the cathedral took place and was led by both Patriarch Bartholomew and Patriarch Daniel. The first patronal feast of the People's Salvation Cathedral was celebrated on 30 November, on the day of Saint Andrew the First Called, and the Liturgy was officiated by Patriarch Theophilos III of Jerusalem and Patriarch Daniel of Romania. The first Te Deum of the cathedral was celebrated on 1 December 2018.

Cathedral records 
People's Salvation Cathedral:
 is the tallest domed cathedral in the world (127 m when completed; 120 m at the moment ). It is the 3rd tallest domed church building in the world and will also become the 14th tallest church building in the world when completed.
 has the tallest unpenetrated (without oculus) dome in the world (104 m – inside). It also has the tallest dome outside – 121 m without the lantern and the cross.
 will have the largest mosaic collection (interior decoration) in the world when it is completed (18,000 m2).
 has the largest free-swinging church bell in the world (25.2 tons).
 has the largest iconostasis in the world (407 m2).
 has hosted the largest number of religious leaders (the Pope, the Ecumenical Patriarch, the Patriarch of Jerusalem and the Patriarch of the Romanian Orthodox Church) among all church buildings in the world.
 is the largest by volume (323,000  m3) and area (6,000 m2), the tallest (127 m when completed ) and longest (126 m) Orthodox church building in the world. It is also one of the largest church buildings in the world.
 has the tallest (44 m), widest (25.2 m) and longest Orthodox church nave in the world. It is the 2nd widest and 8th tallest among all naves in the world (only 2 meters lower than the nave of St. Peter's Basilica, which is the second tallest nave in the world).

History 
The idea of a national cathedral first emerged following the Romanian War of Independence (1877–1878), which was mainly fought between the Russian and Ottoman Empires. The church was to symbolise the victory of Orthodox Christians over the Ottoman Muslims. The idea was shelved for lack of consensus on design, location and funding. The Unification of the Romanian Principalities in 1859, entailed a unitary organisation of church structures in Moldavia and Wallachia within the Holy Synod (1872), thus the assembly of hierarchs increased to 12 members, including: the Primate Metropolitan (chairman), the Metropolitan of Moldavia and their suffragan bishops of Râmnic, Buzău, Argeș, Roman, Huși and Lower Danube (Galați) and one auxiliary vicar-bishop for every diocese. The old Metropolitan Cathedral had proved overcrowded, especially during the national holidays, such as the Proclamation of the Kingdom of Romania and the crowning of King Carol I of Romania (10 May 1881), when none of the over one hundred churches in Bucharest was able to receive those who would have wanted to participate in the official service. Therefore, at King Carol I's desire, Romania's Assembly of Deputies and the Senate voted in favour of the Law no. 1750 on the construction of the Cathedral Church in Bucharest, promulgated by King Carol I on 5 June 1884.

On 10 May 1920, King Ferdinand I sent a Royal letter to Archbishop Miron Cristea, the first Metropolitan-Primate of Greater Romania, supporting the project, but this had no effect. In 1925, after the Romanian Orthodox Church became an independent patriarchate, Metropolitan Cristea, now newly enthroned as the first Patriarch of All Romania, suggested Carol Park as a site, but Bibescu Vodă Square (Unirii Square) was chosen instead. There, in 1929, a cross (calvary) was raised. Lack of funds meant the construction was postponed and later forgotten. The process was stopped due to the economic crisis, World War II, and then the establishment of the communist regime in Romania.

Patriarch Teoctist was the one who re-launched the project of building a National Cathedral, in this sense sanctifying a cross on 5 February 1999 as the cornerstone of the future cathedral, in the place of Unirii Square that had previously been sanctified by Patriarch Miron Cristea. Meanwhile, there had been an epochal event, which was the visit by Pope John Paul II to Romania (7–9 May 1999).

On 16 February 2005, the Bucharest City Hall proposed to the Patriarchate "as the most suitable place to be available" for the structure, which was the Arsenal Hill, considered the highest place in Bucharest. Following the Patriarchate's approval, the Government of Romania promoted the Ordinance no.19/17 March 2005 for the building of the People's Salvation Cathedral. Then the Chamber of Deputies voted to give the building site of 110,000 m2 to the Romanian Patriarchate by the protocol of 13 February 2006. The Arsenal Hill was recommended after three other locations were proposed at different stages (Piața Unirii 1999, Alba Iulia Square 2001, Carol Park 2004). Three churches were demolished (Alba Postăvari, Spirea Veche, and Izvorul Tămăduirii), and two churches had been moved (Schitul Maicilor and Mihai Vodă), by the communist regime to build Centrul Civic (the Civic Centre) and the Palace of the Parliament (Romanian: Palatul Parlamentului), previously known as the House of the People (Romanian: Casa Poporului). The cornerstone for the construction of the People's Salvation Cathedral was sanctified on 29 November 2007, being officiated by Patriarch Daniel, the sixth Patriarch of the Romanian Orthodox Church.

Building began in 2010, and after almost a decade of construction, the cathedral was consecrated on 25 November 2018. The consecration was held in the presence of 100 priests, including 60 bishops. Special guests were the Ecumenical Patriarch of Constantinople Bartholomew I and Metropolitan Chrysostomos of Patras. Approximately 55,000 people attended at the Divine Liturgy which took place inside the cathedral just after its consecration.

Dedicated holidays 
The Ascension of God is the first celebration of the day, because it is also the day of the Romanian heroes of all time and of all places, and the second is the celebration of Saint Apostle Andrew the first called, Protector of Romania. Patriarch Daniel said about the first celebration: "The homage to the memory of the Romanian heroes during World War I, who fought for national freedom, unity and dignity, must be today a source of inspiration and renewal for patriotic Romanians. That is why, the main dedication of the People's Salvation Cathedral is the Lord's Ascension when we celebrate the Day of Heroes. Thus, besides the practical necessity of the future National Cathedral, this is also a national spiritual symbol, being dedicated to the worship of those who have sacrificed themselves for the defense of the homeland and the Orthodox ancestral faith and for the freedom of the Romanian people". Patriarch Daniel said about the second celebration: "This building will be a symbol of national unity because the feast of Saint Apostle Andrew, which was placed the day before the National Day on 1 December, shows that the national unity has settled with us on the Romanians primarily on spiritual unity, on unity of faith, thought and sentiment. Our church greatly contributed to the development Romanian language and Romanian culture."

Construction 

Romanian Patriarchy launched on 28 December 2009 the tender for the selection of the project of the People's Salvation Cathedral. The design proposal should include the feasibility study (SF) and the technical documentation for the construction authorization (DTAC). The delivery term of the documentation accompanied by the proposed model layout was established on 31 May 2010. In June, the Patriarchal Commission for coordination and verification of design works, together with the technical subcommittees for evaluation on architecture, resilience and facilities specialties analyzed the projects presented and determined the scores obtained by the participants. Later, between 30 June and 1 July (2010), the commission of final evaluation of projects under the chairmanship of Patriarch Daniel met at the Patriarchal Palace. SC WANEL EXIM SRL (Bacău) was declared winner.

On 10 December 2010, construction of the cathedral began. The wall of the cathedral from outside to inside has the following structure: hollow bricks, flexible reinforcements (metal bars), rigid metal structure (welded sheets metal reinforcement), flexible reinforcements and solid bricks. For the People's Salvation Cathedral were used 145,000 cubic meters of concrete and 35,000 tons of reinforcement. They were also used 6,200 cubic meters of solid bricks produced at Câmpulung Muscel and 7,800 cubic meters hollow bricks produced at Târgu Jiu. For the solid bricks, was used clay from the Grui hill, near Câmpulung Muscel. The total weight of the bricks used for the People's Salvation Cathedral is 22,000 tons. The bricks used are absorbent, so that with the application of the first layer of plaster, due to the porosity of the brick, there is adhesion between the mortar layer and the brick. When the bricks are hit, they make a glass sound.

Energy efficiency is assured by massive walls of resistance and brick used on the inside and outside of them. The cathedral is designed to withstand earthquakes of 9 on the Richter scale. The plan of the cathedral complex includes a cathedral building; below the cathedral building, a soup kitchen with capacity for 1,000; two hotels; and parking for about 500 cars.

The cathedral should receive its final touch, the paintwork, by 2025 according to the Romanian Orthodox Church. The chapel of the cathedral was built in 2011, exclusively from sponsorships. In this chapel, there are liturgical services for the good works of the People's Salvation Cathedral, for the workers, but also for the founders and donors. In the chapel is a copy of the Icon Theotokos Acheiropoieta (Prodromiţa) from the Romanian Skete Prodromos in Mount Athos. Also, here is the reliquary with the relics of Saint John Chrysostom, the 37th archbishop of Constantinople.

Architecture 

The design of the new cathedral was debated by parties including the Romanian Senate and the Mayor of Bucharest. The winning design featured elements of architectural details from all the Romanian provinces and territories in an area that would make the cathedral complex one of the largest religious sites in the world. The cathedral is projected for over 20,000 people in the main cathedral building and underground galleries. A total of 7,000 worshipers can attend the holy liturgy at the same time, with a 1,000 member choir, clergy and 6,000 pilgrims in the main cathedral building. The underground chapel could accommodate 5,000 pilgrims, and the underground St. Andrew's Cave gallery could accommodate over 10,000 pilgrims. In the whole complex could accommodate 125,000 visitors on an area of 11 hectares, and in the piazza could accommodate 43,000 visitors. The main cathedral has 6,050 square meters (floor nave) and with stairway has 8,400 square meters. The basement area which extending below the ground level, has 7,200 square meters. The volume of the cathedral is 323,000 cubic meters, and with the pedestal is 595,000 cubic meters.

In January 2018, the Patriarchate requested portfolios with mosaics made by painters from all over Romania, throughout their careers, the winner will make the mosaic of the National Cathedral. The iconographer Daniel Codrescu won, and together with his team he started working in February. The team has about 60 people, most are top specialists in iconography and mosaic art, and a few apprentice students. They work in the workshop and on the construction site. After the iconographic scenes are made, painted, and chosen the model of the tesserae by Daniel Codrescu, the drawings are sent to the Romanian Patriarchate for approval, then part of the team makes the mosaic with millions of tesserae according to the drawings, and finally the rest of the team assembles the mosaic on wall.

Along with the Palace of Parliament, the Romanian Academy, the Ministry of National Defense, the cathedral can be seen as a vertical axis or a unifying pole for these buildings in a unitary and representative urban ensemble. Also, the cathedral located on Spirea's Hill (Arsenal Square) near the Ministry of National Defense, can be considered the Cathedral of Romanian heroes of all times, who sacrificed themselves for the defense of the homeland.

Mosaics of the cathedral 
According to the iconographic plan, the mosaics of the cathedral show the historical basis of the Orthodox Church, thus the iconography of the cathedral includes: the Church of the Apostolic Age rendered by the representation of the twelve Apostles, the Church of the Patristic Age of the holy fathers from the Greek, Syriac, Latin and Slavic Churches, and the Romanian Orthodox Church old and contemporary. In addition to the saints from the universal church, on the walls of the cathedral will be represented the great saints of the Romanian nation. Also, certain spaces inside the cathedral will be dedicated to the confessors saints from the Romanian communist prisons, such as the priests Stăniloae, Sofian, Cleopa, Partenie Gherasim and others. The mosaic of the cathedral is made according to the hesychastic tradition  and in the Neo-Byzantine style. The architecture of the cathedral is a synthesis between tradition and contemporaneity, through national architectural elements such as Brâncovenesc porches, Transylvanian towers and Moldavian ocnites (niches).

For the mosaic of the People's Salvation Cathedral, is mainly used glass made in Venice and Carrara stone. In completion to glass made in Venice, glass made in Florence is also used. The Murano glass is processed by the Venetian foundry Orsoni, which produce 24K gold leaf mosaics, blown gold and Venetian smalti in more than 3,500 colors. The smalti Orsoni was used in the decoration of the St.Mark's Basilica, Sagrada Familia, or Washington Basilica. The Carrara stone was used in many sculptures of the Renaissance, such as Michelangelo's Pietà, and in the mosaic technique. The gold glass was chosen after the glass used at St.Mark's Basilica, being lighter in color. Murano glass from Orsoni Venezia was used to restore the St.Mark's Basilica, the same company that supply the glass to the People's Salvation Cathedral.

The tesserae are made of colored glass. The gold glass, on the side from the wall they are green-blue, to better reflect the light on the golden side, from the viewer. First, the figures were drawn and then painted "in the mirror" on a paper support and over them was mounted the mosaic, with the gold layer facing inside, towards the painted support. After applying the mosaic painting on the wall and cleaning the paper support on which it had been mirror-mounted, the mosaic remains mounted with the golden part of the tesserae towards the onlooker. For soldering is used a natural glue, made of water and flour, which after fixing on the wall, will be easy to soak and wash with the paper on which it was glued. In Byzantium, lime mixed with sand was used, which dried quickly, which did not allow very detailed finishes. Making a square meter are used approximately 16 kg of mosaic involves joining about 10,000 tesserae, applied with a special cement-based adhesive, working 4-7 days to arrange them according to the difficulty and size of the pixelization. For the People's Salvation Cathedral will require about 400 tons of tesserae, covering an area of 25,000 square meters.

Nave 

The vaulted nave reaches an interior height of 44 meters, being the Orthodox church with the highest interior nave and among the highest in the world. With nave width of 25.2 meters People's Salvation Cathedral is the church building with the second widest nave in the world after St. Peter's Basilica in Vatican City (27 m). Hagia Sophia in Istanbul has bigger span (wall to wall – 31 m) but it has not a nave in the strict sense. The main hall of the cathedral has 2,800 square meters (floor nave) with 79.8 m (colonnade – iconostasis) by 65.1 m (apses), and the square of the central space below the dome where rests on four vaults occupies 635 square meters. If the main door of the cathedral and the door of the iconostasis are open, a person who is at the entrance (colonnade) sees the altar table at 105 m, and if he is in the middle of the naos (the area under the main dome), from the floor also at 105 m sees the ceiling of the dome (Pantocrator).

The floor of the cathedral will be covered with marble from Rușchița, the best marble in Romania. This marble has been used for many famous buildings: Romanian Parliament Building, Milan Cathedral, Hungarian Parliament Building, Istana Nurul Iman etc. The eagle in the Oval Office at the White House, one of the American symbols, is white Rușchița marble. Rușchița is the most renowned marble deposit in Romania. The quarry is located in Caraș-Severin County, south of the Poiana Ruscă Mountains. The marble from Rușchița is subsequently processed at Simeria, where the final product is made. The marble models used mainly for the cathedral are Rușchița Classico and Rușchița Champagne. The Rușchița Classico has a white-yellow color, and the Rușchița Champagne has a white-pinkish color. Inside the cathedral is used Rușchița marble up to 4 meters high, and the marble for the access steps of the cathedral has 7 cm thickness.

Vratsa marble from Bulgaria, it is used outside the cathedral up to 7 meters high. Vratsa stone is also used for window and door frames, for the hardness of the stone. For the interior decorations in the nave and altar is used Carrara marble. It is quarried from the Apuan Alps mountains in the province of Massa and Carrara, near the city of Carrara, in the region of Tuscany, Italy. Carrara marble is a type of marble popular for use in building decor. The marble from Carrara was used for some of the most remarkable buildings in Ancient Rome, such as Pantheon, and other notable construction such as Siena Cathedral, Legislative Palace of Uruguay, Glasgow City Chambers, Finlandia Hall, Akshardham (New Delhi) etc.

The National Cathedral has 27 bronze doors with iconographic representations. Some bronze doors are 2.7 meters width with 5 meters height, and other bronze doors are 2.7 meters width with 6.35 meters height at the arch. A single door has 4 tons. These are coordinated by a computer system that command the automatic opening of the doors in case of alarm. The doors were made at Süßen by Strassacker. The same company also made the bronze crosses on the towers. Initially, six companies from Austria and six companies from Germany were contacted and finally the company from Süßen was chosen. The bas-reliefs of the saints are life-size. Over 50 saints are represented on the doors of the cathedral. At the entrance on the main doors is the Mother of God and the Savior Jesus Christ. On the doors are represented martyrs, hierarchs, including over twenty Romanian saints. In 2017, Patriarch Daniel said that, the cathedral belongs to all Romanian saints, from all parts of the country.

The People's Salvation Cathedral has a total of 396 windows that were made in Belgium by the company Reynaers, treated electrochemically by anodizing, and assembled in Ploiești. The largest window of the cathedral, stained glass window at the entrance with the scene of the Ascension of Christ has 90 square meters and it cost 200,000 euros.

Apses (Nave) and Arces

In 2022 the Nativity of Jesus scene was completed in the southern apse. Among the scenes painted in mosaic on the medium and superior tiers of this apse are: 
the Visitation, Adoration of the magi, Joseph’s dream, flight into Egypt, massacre of the Innocents, census of Quirinius, presentation of Jesus at the temple, wedding at Cana and Jesus blessing the children. They are all related to the theme of family. 

The vaulted nave reaches an inner height at the arches supporting the dome of 40.35 meters. The triumphal arch between the altar and nave includes the iconographic representation of twelve Old Testament Prophets, the venerable Melchizedek, along with the throne of Hetoimasia and the representation of the heavenly powers: Cherubim, Seraphim and Angels. The prophets shown in medallions of 1.8 meters, hold in their hands symbolic representations, anticipating Theotokos and the foreshadowing of the incarnation of the Lord Jesus Christ. The main mosaic of the triumphal arch is Hetoimasia (gr:ἑτοιμασία), also known as the throne of the Last Judgment or the Second Coming. The scene contains: the dove of the Holy Spirit, the spear and sponge on a stick, the nails from the cross and crown of thorns. An empty throne with a Gospel Book on it, was being placed in the chamber of church councils to represent Christ, at the First Council of Ephesus in 431. The scene is inspired by the painted church exterior at Voroneţ Monastery in Romania (1547). On the mosaic Hetoimasia's edge is written: Justice and judgment are the habitation of Thy throne; mercy and truth shall go before Thy face  (gr-Ps:88; en-Ps:89).

Dome 

With total height of 135 m (ground-top cross), will become the third tallest domed church in the world, after Basilica of Our Lady of Peace and St.Peter's Basilica. Also with 127.1 meters, it has the second tallest top dome without the cross in the world, after the dome of St.Peter's Basilica. The concrete part of the dome at 106.2 meters, was completed on 24 May 2019.

Cupola Christ Pantocrator dome at a height of 105.4 m from the floor of the People's Salvation Cathedral, surpasses the interior height dome of St.Peter's Basilica which has 101.8 m from the floor of the basilica. At the base, the diameter of cupola is 16.8 m inside with 18.4 m outside (concrete) and the shape is of perfect hemisphere. The belvedere dome (viewpoint for visitors at 97.8 m height from the ground) between colonnades has a diameter of 29.4 m and a circumference approximately 93 m.

The roof sheet is a CuAl5Zn5 alloy (Tecu-Gold), where copper has 91.55% (99.99% purity) and 8.45% aluminium bronze, and was made by the German company KME. The copper sheet area used for the cathedral is 19,913 square meters.

Iconostasis 

The iconostasis of the People's Salvation Cathedral, with the size of 23.8 meters length and 17.1 meters height, is the largest Orthodox iconostasis in the world. It has an area of 407 square meters, is covered with over 4 million tesserae of mosaic and weighs 8 tons and with the adhesive 10 tons. The iconostasis is covered with mosaic on both sides, having 800 square meters of mosaics, and is made of reinforced concrete with a thickness of 1.26 meters. The royal gate has an inner vaulted of 4.28 meters height with 2.50 meters width, the edge of the gate being covered with 12.4 tons of Onyx stone. Age-old since the world began, the onyx is the first gemstone which find in the pages of the Old Testament, in the Garden of Eden (Genesis 2:12).

For the realization of the iconostasis of the cathedral in Bucharest, a team of over 45 mosaic and fresco specialists worked for ten months. The leader of this team was iconographer Daniel Codrescu. Originally, the team had thought of marble frames for each large icon, but because the weight of the material could have affected the structure of the iconostasis resistance, the idea was abandoned. This iconostasis is made entirely of mosaic and fresco in Byzantine style. The team involved in the project was divided into two groups: the first involved in making the mosaics in the workshop, and the second in fitting them on the stonework. A source of inspiration was the famous mosaics in Ravenna, represented by the Basilica of San Vitale. Iconographer Daniel Codrescu said: "Everything is worked in the smallest details. The team tried to take the realization to another level of greatness. With the help of God, this monumental work is a gift to the Centenary of Romania. This iconostasis is the summary of the kingdom of heavens." The front of the iconostasis has 45 icons placed on four registers. The first register has six royal icons, the second register has thirteen icons with royal feasts, the third register has the icon of the Holy Trinity (center) and the twelve Apostles, and the fourth register has the Theotokos (center) and the twelve Prophets of the Old Testament. On the four side doors are the four archangels, and on the royal door are the Annunciation and the four Evangelists. The royal icons have the dimensions of 2.15 meters width with 3.75 meters height and an area of 8 square meters. All icons of the iconostasis have a total of 130 portraits.

The rear face of the iconostasis contains three registers. The upper register in the center contains the Last Supper, represented by the liturgical variant in the hemicycle altar through the Partaking of the Apostles. On the left is Jesus Christ washing the feet of the disciples. It is a ritual practiced on Holy Thursday (Maundy Thursday). On the right are two scenes, the road to Emmaus appearance and the Supper at Emmaus. The middle and lower registers have eighteen Romanian saints, hierarchs, pious and priests. The iconostasis and the altar are joined by two walls, on which are four saints.

Commonly, on the iconostasis are four royal icons, but here we have six, which has helped us to represent the two patronal feasts, "Ascension of the Lord" and "Saint Apostle Andrew".  On the left is placed the icons of Saint Nicholas and Saint John the Baptist, two of the most beloved saints in Romanian space. Like a peculiarity, in the registry of the Saints Apostles is represented the Holy Trinity, which in this case occupies the place of the Judge Right. The latter, has been moved to the royal icon of the Savior Jesus Christ. Together with the icon of the Theotokos and Saint John the Baptist is symbolized the Deesis icon. The Holy Trinity was chosen by Patriarch Daniel, to emphasize the Scripture quote that says, "Going, teach all nations, baptizing them in the name of the Father and of the Son and of the Holy Spirit" (Matthew 28:19). The Saints Apostles preach the teaching of the Holy Trinity, being the representatives who baptizes the nations.

At each entrance to the altar above the five doors, from right to left is written: 1st door – Behold, a door standing open in heaven (Revelation 4); 2nd door – God of life!, open the doors of repentance to me, that my spirit sighs at Your holy church (Horologion); central door – Peace be to you! (John 20); 4th door – Blessed Virgin Theotokos open to us the door of mercy, so that those who trust in you may not perish (Triodion); 5th door – He brought me by way of the north gate to the front of the temple, and I looked, and behold, the glory of the Lord filled the temple of the Lord (Ezekiel 44).

In December 2021, the Crucifix was placed on the iconostasis after structure was made in August. The cross and the two side mosaics (ro:Molenii), were made between 2018-2021 by the iconographer Daniel Codrescu, along with other nine mosaic specialists. The Crucifix with a height of 4.3 meters, rising to 22.3 meters from the floor of the cathedral. In the side-attendant of the Crucifix, are the mosaics of the Theotokos and Saint John the Apostle, and together with the Crucifix have 10 square meters of mosaic. On the face behind the Crucifix, is a pelican with chicks, and at the bottom is a quote from the second ode of the Lord's Lamentations at the Burial (ro:Prohod): Like a pelican, You hurt yourself into your rib, O Saviour!; You gave your life, for your sons who died, spreading living springs over them. The image of the mother pelican feeding her chicks with his blood, is rooted in an ancient legends which preceded Christianity. The pelican is a symbol of the Passion of Jesus for Christianity and the Eucharist in the East and in the West. On the back of the mosaic Theotokos, writes: upon Thy right hand did stand the queen, embellished in a golden vestment and too beautify! (gr-Ps:44; en-Ps:45); and on the back of the mosaic John the Apostle, writes: thine Own of thine Own, we offer unto Thee on behalf of all and for all (Anaphora Liturgy-Byzantine Rite). The sides of the cross are decorated with a golden interlace ornament braided on a red background. The interlace recalls the archaic motif of the braided rope as a symbol of eternal life. The red decoration signifies the blood sacrificed on the cross and the royal power of the Lord. Among the sources of inspiration are the crucifix paintings from Studenica Monastery (1208), Moldovița Monastery (1532), and the crucifixes of Cimabue and Giotto.

Altar 

The mosaic of the altar including iconostasis is about 3,000 square meters. The iconography of the altar excluding iconostasis, comprises five sections: the apse and the hemicycle of the altar with three central registers and the vestment wall. The vaulted apse altar reaches an interior height of 42.2 meters from the floor of cathedral, and the floor of the altar where the Holy Liturgy are held is about 330 square meters.

On 7 May 2019, the Theotokos Platytera (gr:Πλατυτέρα των Ουρανών) icon was completed in the apse altar. It is the largest mosaic of Theotokos in the world, having 16 meters height and 150 square meters. The idea he started, is the Theotokos mosaic from the Hagia Sophia, but larger in size than this. Following the conversion of the Hagia Sophia to a mosque, the coordinator of the team of iconographers Daniel Codrescu expressed his wish that the Theotokos of National Cathedral from Bucharest, will symbolically replace the Theotokos from Constantinople. It is a synthesis "according to the Romanian soul" with elements from several well-known icons, Daniel Codrescu explained. To make the Platytera mosaic, one million pieces of mosaic were used. For the mantle of the Mother of God, nine different colors of red were used. Below the Theotokos Platytera icon are nine windows through which light enters, like the nine biblical ode, emphasizing the description of the Queen of Heavens. The Theotokos Platytera icon is surrounded by the archangels Michael and Gabriel, each having 13 meters height with 5 meters width and the wings 10 meters in length. The mosaic of the Theotokos and archangels is about 600 square meters. In June 2020, the mosaic of apse altar was completed having about 1,000 square meters.

The altar registers below the apse altar, are three in number. The upper register of the hemicycle, in the center contains the Tabernacle of the Congregation, which was a foreshadowing of the Mother of God in the Old Testament. On the left is the scene of Abraham's Sacrifice, and on the right is the scene of Melchizedek's Tribute offering. The middle register in the center contains the establishing of the New Testament through the Partaking of the Apostles. On the left is the Holy Trinity in the version of Abraham's Hospitality (gr:Φιλοξενία), and on the right is the Prophet Elijah fed by the ravens. The lower register is dedicated to eighteen Romanian saints hierarchs. The last section of the altar is the vestment wall, which includes nine stained glass with saints.

The mosaic of the Apostles Partaking is 22 meters length by 7 meters height, and the Savior have 4 meters height. The Eucharist also known as Holy Communion, or the Lord's Supper is a symbolic scene of the Apostles Partaking. Angels with fans stand on either side of the Communion table. To their left and right is the twice portrayed figure of Christ: on the left is breaking bread, on the right shares the wine, and the disciples coming to Him from both sides for Communion. Among the sources of inspiration is the mosaic in the altar of Saint Sophia Cathedral in Kyiv (11th century), but also by the Eucharist mosaic from the museum of the same cathedral, which belonged to the demolished St.Michael's Monastery in Kyiv (1113).

The floor of the altar and the soleas are covered with marble and Rușchița stone, the models used being Muse Campagne, Caffe Latte, Sun Red, White Sivec, White Onyx stone and Yellow Onyx stone. Below the Holy Table of the altar are placed the relics fragments of the Saint Martyr Constantin Brâncoveanu, and the relics fragments of the saints martyrs from Niculițel. Also inside the Holy Table, there is a list of 350,000 names of the Romanian heroes from the First and Second World War.

Courtyard 

The adjacent buildings will provide accommodation for pilgrims, pastoral, cultural, social and medical activities of the church. The cathedral's courtyard has four annexes: Saint Andrew's House for clergy pilgrims with 90 rooms; Saint Peter's House with a capacity of one hundred people; Saint Paul's House, will be the missionary cultural center with classrooms and seminars, a library, exhibition spaces and Aula Magna Hall; Saint Luca's House, which will be a medical social center with consulting rooms, an emergency reception center, an analytical laboratory and intensive care center, and a residential accommodation center for the elderly and the sick. Saint Andrew's House, Saint Peter's House, Saint Paul's House and the Saint Luca's House each will have 1,755 square meters.

The esplanade of the cathedral is located above the underground gallery called St.Andrew's Cave and implicitly has the same area of 15,581 square meters. One of the portico includes the pangar of the cathedral, and the other portico includes the place where the candles burn, each portico having 1,116 square meters. Behind the cathedral on the left, there will be a five hectare park, where a monument dedicated to the Ascension of Christ will be arranged. Part of the earth excavated at the foundation of the cathedral will be used for this monument.

Underground galleries 

The cathedral has two large underground galleries. In the underground chapel a total of 5,000 people can attend the holy liturgy at the same time, and in the large polyvalent gallery under the cathedral esplanade called St.Andrew's Cave can be accommodate over 10,000 people. The underground chapel has two levels, which are connected to the main hall by colonnades, arcades and stairs, and has 7,200 square meters with 126 meters by 63 meters. The chapel hall has eleven meters high and the same dimensions (horizontally) as the main hall of the cathedral, except that it has no apse area. With annexes the underground chapel has 13,668 square meters, with 155 meters by 92 meters. The gallery St.Andrew's Cave has 15,581 square meters (including annexes) with 143 meters by 118 meters. If a person walks through the entire underground gallery of the cathedral from west to east, he has to walk 300 meters in a straight line. The two large underground galleries together have approximately 30,000 square meters. The galleries are divided into: spaces including a main hall, other halls and rooms for events; an icon and religious clothing shop; a workshop (for carpentry, upholstery and metal work for example); a museum, gallery-exhibition, liturgical performance media shop; as well as storage rooms, a refectory, religious/sacramental objects and employees rooms.

Initially instead of the underground room of St.Andrew's Cave, a car park was planned there. But this was becoming an inconvenience for the underground chapel, due to emissions from cars, the plan was abandoned. Thus, the car park will be arranged on the left side of the courtyard from the west. The St.Andrew's Cave gallery will host the Museum of Romanian Christianity. Under the cathedral chapel at a depth of 16 meters, will be arranged only technical spaces for installations. Also at this level, 42 crypts will be arranged for the patriarchs of Romania and four atomic bunkers.

The chapel will have a liturgical program for the monastery (daily). Liturgical services in the cathedral will be held on Sundays and on important holidays. The Holy Altar of the chapel is dedicated to Saint John James the Chozebite and Daniil Sihastru, because they both lived a part of their lives in the cave. Saint John James the Chozebite (Hosevite) became a monk at Neamt Monastery and soon after his conversion he moved to the Holy Land where he lived near the downstream of the Jordan river, near Jericho. Toward the end of his life, he lived in the wilderness of Choziba at the Saint George Monastery. In 1992 he was declared a saint by the Romanian Orthodox Patriarchate and in 2016 he was officially recognised as such by the Greek Orthodox Patriarchate of Jerusalem. The Church celebrates his feast day on 5 August. Daniil Sihastrul (or Daniel the Hesychast) was a renowned Romanian Orthodox spiritual guide, hermit, hegumen of Voroneț Monastery and advisor of Stephen the Great. He encouraged Stephen the Great to fight for the defense of Christendom and to build holy places, after each battle won against the invaders. Canonized by the Romanian Orthodox Church in 1992, he is commemorated on 18 December.

Bells 

The cathedral has the world's largest free-swinging church bell, surpassing the Saint Peter's bell (Petersglocke) in the Cologne Cathedral. With a weight of 25,190 kg, a clapper of 750 kg, a diameter of 3,355 mm, a height of 3,130 mm, thickness of 273 mm, the bell was cast on 11 November 2016 in Innsbruck by Grassmayr and is elevated to 65 meters. The casting time was 9 minutes and 23 seconds, the bell being made of 78% copper and 22% tin both 99.99% purity, and has a very low beat C3 (en) – C0 (de) – Do2 (ro) with 130.8 Hz. The cathedral has six bells weighing 32,243 kg, and the sound of the big bell is heard from 15 to 20 km. For the biggest bell 425,000 euros were paid, and the total value of the six bells totalled roughly 550,000 euros.

A team of 25 experts from Italy, Germany, Austria, Croatia and Romania, worked on the great bell of the People's Salvation Cathedral. The leader of the team was the Italian campanologist Flavio Zambotto. Flavio Zambotto said about the bell: "The collaboration for the bell of the Cathedral in Bucharest is my greatest professional achievement. For this bell the team worked 8 months. The bell is made of the premium alloys, at the highest standards. Work was done in the smallest details, and at a purity of 99.99%, the acoustic tolerance is 0%. I had the honor of working at some famous bells and every bell is like a son to me. But the bell of the Cathedral in Bucharest is magnificent, among the best in the world. All acoustic parameters are superlative. The sound is sober, very strong, long and it marks you."

The sound of the big bell in the People's Salvation Cathedral of Bucharest was chosen especially by the sound of the famous bell Pummerin in the Saint Stephen's Cathedral of Vienna. As against to Pummerin, the sound is more low, stronger and longer. The big bell will ring only on declared national days and on major holidays. The sound of the 6 bells spans two complete octaves.

Criticism 
Often in the national media, critics associate the People's Salvation Cathedral and the Palace of the Parliament, the two colossuses of Romania's capital that share the same courtyard. As the largest Orthodox church in the world, next to the world's heaviest and second largest administrative building in the world, French newspaper Le Figaro, named it "a pharaonic project", "worthy of the megalomania of Nicolae Ceaușescu". A Romanian newspaper said that the People's Salvation Cathedral will be the most expensive building built in the country  after the Romanian Revolution of 1989. Another Romanian newspaper said that the politicians of the Romanian government depend on support from the Romanian Patriarchate in the election campaign, and estimates that when the cathedral will be fully completed, the value of the cathedral in the real estate market will be over €1 billion. A Romanian journalist called the cathedral a "God mall".

The Romanian Orthodox Church's answer to such criticism was that the new cathedral would not imitate the gigantic buildings of the communist era, but would "correct them, through a decent and harmonious volumetry". The presence of the cathedral in the area with the Parliament of Romania, the Ministry of National Defense and the Romanian Academy, is seen as a dialogue and necessity for the benefit of the national homeland.

Historical dates

Consecration 

On 23 November 2018, the Ecumenical Patriarch arrived in Romania to lead the consecration of the People's Salvation Cathedral which was planned on Sunday 25 November; the Ecumenical Patriarch was officially welcomed by Patriarch Daniel of Romania. In his welcoming speech, Patriarch Daniel talked about the "spiritual connection between the Ecumenical Patriarchate, Mother-Church, and the Romanian Orthodox Church, Daughter-Church"

On 24 November, at the Patriarchal Residence in Bucharest, during the meeting of the synod of the Romanian Orthodox Church, Patriarch Daniel of Romania made a speech to the Ecumenical Patriarch, thanking him for the cooperation between the Romanian Orthodox Church and the Ecumenical Patriarchate. During the same meeting, the Ecumenical Patriarch made a speech to the Romanian Orthodox synod, stating that he was "sure the Romanian Orthodox Church will be involved in preserving the church unity and justice."

On Sunday 25 November, the Ecumenical Patriarch with Patriarch Daniel of Romania and Metropolitan Chrysostomos of Patras consecrated together the People's Salvation Cathedral with myrrh and holy water. At the big event, the consecration was held in the presence of 60 bishops by Romania and other Orthodox countries, together with 40 hegumens and protopopes, to mark the Centenary of Romania.
 
The Ecumenical Patriarch chaired the first liturgy of the Romanian People's Salvation Cathedral. Both the Ecumenical Patriarch Bartholomew I and the Patriarch Daniel of Romania led the church service this day; it was the very first church service in the cathedral. During his homily at the cathedral, Ecumenical Patriarch Bartholomew said he was "connected" to Patriarch Daniel of Romania with his "old personal, pure and sincerely tested friendship, but also with the unshaken, brotherly love in Christ and good understanding." On 26 November, Patriarch Bartholomew went back to Istanbul. Thousands of people travelled from all parts of the country to attend the consecration, disregarding the cold weather and waiting times to get a chance to enter the cathedral. Although they travelled hundreds of kilometres to participate in the consecration of the National Cathedral, the cathedral appeared to them as a chimney shrouded in fog, which they had to look at from afar, climbing on fences and surrounded by the gendarmes.

The Ecumenical Patriarch and Patriarch Daniel signed the Document of Consecration.

The presence of Patriarch Bartholomew and the absence of Patriarch Kiril of Moscow at the cathedral inauguration "appears to suggest that Romania is siding with Constantinople in the dispute." To the questions: "Will Patriarch Kiril in Romania come to the sanctification of the painting?" and "How will the presence of His Holiness Bartholomew I affect the relationship between the ROC [Romanian Orthodox Church] and the Russian Patriarchate [Russian Orthodox Church]?", the Romanian Patriarchate spokesman Vasile Bănescu answered: "I am absolutely convinced that Patriarch Kiril will return to Romania on the occasion of the sanctification of the painting and will not withdraw because the ROC had the wisdom to plead for a dialogue to heal the wound of this separation between the Patriarchate of Constantinople and the Patriarchate of Moscow and All Russia. [...] We hope that this relationship, currently interrupted, will be resumed. The Romanian Patriarchate has a natural relationship with the Moscow Patriarchate and there are no tensions at the moment"

Pope Francis 

On 31 May 2019, Pope Francis arrived in Romania, visiting the cathedral the same day. Pope Francis expressed the hope that "Romania can always be a home of all, a place of meeting, a garden in which reconciliation and communion flourish." The pope emphasized brotherhood and communion among all who prayed to the same Heavenly Father. He said: "Each time we pray, we ask that our trespasses, our debts, be forgiven.  This takes courage, for it means that we must forgive the trespasses of others, the debts that others have incurred in our regard.  We need to find the strength to forgive our brother or sister from the heart (Mt 18:35), even as you, Father, forgive our trespasses: to leave the past behind us and, together, to embrace the present.  Help us, Father, not to yield to fear, not to see openness as a threat, to find the strength to forgive each other and move on, and the courage not to settle for a quiet life but to keep seeking, with transparency and sincerity, the face of our brothers and sisters... I come as a pilgrim desirous of seeing the Lord's Face in the faces of my Brothers."

See also
List of largest Eastern Orthodox church buildings
 List of largest church buildings
 List of tallest church buildings
 List of tallest domes
 List of highest church naves

Romania

 Romanian Orthodox Church
 Religion in Romania
 History of Christianity in Romania

Notes

References

Further reading 
 
 Lavinia Stan, Lucian Turcescu, "Politics, National Symbols and the Romanian Orthodox Cathedral," Europe-Asia Studies, November 2006, 58 (7) pp. 1119–1139.

External links 

 Consecration of the People's Salvation Cathedral – Trinitas (video)
 (Official film) The great bell of the People's Salvation Cathedral(Eine Glocke für die Ewigkeit – Una campana para la eternidad) – 3SAT (author)
 Catedralaneamului.ro
 Arhiepiscopia Bucureștilor
 Grassmayr

Romanian Orthodox churches in Bucharest
Romanian Orthodox cathedrals in Romania
21st-century Eastern Orthodox church buildings
Buildings and structures under construction in Romania